The Hohe Loog, is a mountain, in the Haardt, the eastern rim of the Palatine Forest in Germany. The mountain lies within the borough of Neustadt an der Weinstraße in the southern part of the state of Rhineland-Palatinate.

Location 
The Hohe Loog lies west of Neustadt an der Weinstraße and 1.7 km northeast of the Kalmit, the highest mountain in the Haardt. Its name is derived from Loog ("border sign"). On its entirely wooded summit are several sandstone rock outcrops, but the tree cover means that no views of the surrounding area are possible from here. The Hohe Loog has a northeastern outlier, the Rutschsteinberg. Its southeastern counterpart is the Rittersberg, with its conciliation cross (Sühnekreuz); the Rittersberg in turn leads to the Schlossberg, the hill on which Hambach Castle stands. To the north the Hohe Loog drops into the valley of Kaltenbrunnertal. Near the summit is the Hohe Loog House, managed by the Palatine Forest Club, which has an outstanding view of the Kalmit massif and the Rhine Valley.

Routes to the summit 
The Hohe Loog may be climbed on several signed trails established by the Palatine Forest Club. From Neustadt the route runs along the Kaltenbrunner Tal or via the  Nollenkopf. The mountain is also accessible from Diedesfeld via Hambach Castle and the Rittersberg. Another ascent is possible through the Klausental valley from Maikammer. The shortest route to the summit runs from the hiker's car park on the Hahnenschritt saddle below the Kalmit.

See also 
 Bergstein (Hohe Loog), a rock formation and natural monument on the Hohe Loog massif.

References

External links 

Mountains and hills of Rhineland-Palatinate
Mountains and hills of the Palatinate Forest
Mountains under 1000 metres
Neustadt an der Weinstraße